The Box sea catfish (Cathorops multiradiatus) is a species of catfish in the family Ariidae. It was described by Albert Günther in 1864. It is a tropical, marine catfish which occurs in Guatemala, Costa Rica, El Salvador, Colombia, Peru, Ecuador, Mexico, Nicaragua, Honduras, and Panama.

Due to its wide distribution and population density, as well as a lack of major threats or perceived decline in population, the IUCN redlist lists the box sea catfish as Least Concern. It is commercially marketed both fresh and frozen.

References

Ariidae
Fish described in 1864
Taxa named by Albert Günther